Achille Leone Occhetto (born 3 March 1936) is an Italian political figure. He served as the last secretary-general of the Italian Communist Party (PCI) between 1988 and 1991, and the first leader of the Democratic Party of the Left (PDS), the parliamentary socialist successor of the PCI, from 1991 to 1994.

Biography
Occhetto was born in Turin.  He is married to the activist and former actress Elisa Kadigia Bove. They have two sons, Malcolm and Massimiliano, both of whom were born in Sicily.

He served as secretary of the Italian Communist Youth Federation (to which he had belonged starting from 1953) from 1963 to 1966 and, subsequently, as regional secretary of the Italian Communist Party in Sicily, distinguishing himself for his war against any kind of mafia.

He was appointed in 1986 as national coordinator of the PCI and became its secretary in 1988, succeeding Alessandro Natta. Under his leadership, the party witnessed the collapse of both the Berlin wall and the communist regime in the Soviet Union. He responded by declaring the communist experience over, and persuaded the PCI to dissolve and refound itself as a democratic socialist party, the Democratic Party of the Left (PDS).

This political shift (known in Italian politics as the Svolta della Bolognina) was accepted by approximately 70% of the members at the 20th National Congress of the Communist Party (8 February 1991).

In 1994, he challenged and was defeated by Silvio Berlusconi in the 1994 election, leading the Alliance of Progressives; because of this loss he resigned as party secretary.

He returned to politics in the 2004 European elections, being elected to the European Parliament on a joint ticket with anti-corruption campaigner Antonio Di Pietro, but he immediately resigned and was replaced by Giulietto Chiesa. After the 2006 General election, he returned to the European Parliament by taking up one of the seats vacated by an elected Deputy, and sits as an Independent member of the Party of European Socialists group.

In 2009, he joined the new left-wing formation Left Ecology Freedom.

He is an atheist.

References

External links 
 A declaration about "Il Cantiere", a new political project

1936 births
Living people
Politicians from Turin
Italian atheists
Italian Communist Party politicians
Democratic Party of the Left politicians
Democrats of the Left politicians
Democratic Left (Italy) politicians
Left Ecology Freedom politicians
Deputies of Legislature VII of Italy
Deputies of Legislature VIII of Italy
Deputies of Legislature IX of Italy
Deputies of Legislature X of Italy
Deputies of Legislature XI of Italy
Deputies of Legislature XII of Italy
Deputies of Legislature XIII of Italy
Senators of Legislature XIV of Italy
MEPs for Italy 2004–2009